Campo Manuel Marques is a multi-use stadium in Torres Vedras, Portugal.  It is currently used mostly for football matches and is the home stadium of SCU Torreense. The stadium is able to hold 12,000 people and was built in 1925.

Manuel Marques
Sports venues in Lisbon District
Sports venues completed in 1925